Twiley W. Barker, Jr. (January 29, 1926 – July 13, 2009) was an American political scientist and scholar of constitutional law. He was a founding faculty member of the department of political science at the University of Illinois at Chicago, were he worked from 1962 to 1994.

Life and career
Barker was born on January 29, 1926, and he grew up in Franklinton, Louisiana. The political scientist Lucius Barker was Twiley Barker's brother. He attended Tuskegee University as an undergraduate, but he joined the Air Force during his studies, and after his service he completed his bachelor's degree at Southern University. He attended Southern at the same time as his brother Lucius Barker, and the two were persuaded to study politics rather than medicine after taking classes with the political scientist Rodney Higgins. He then obtained his PhD from the University of Illinois at Urbana Champaign in 1955. From 1955 to 1960, he taught at Southern Illinois University, and in 1962 he moved to the University of Illinois at Chicago, where he worked until his retirement in 1994. In addition to being a founding member of that department, Barker was undergraduate director for two decades, and helped set up the pre-law program there.

Barker's scholarship focused on constitutional law and judicial politics in the United States. For example, he wrote a comparative analysis on the first terms of Clarence Thomas and Thurgood Marshall. In 1970, he and his brother Lucius Barker coauthored the textbook Civil Liberties and the Constitution. This textbook had been published in 9 editions by 2020, and is considered a classic textbook on the structure of the American legal system.

Barker was particularly noted as an instructor and a mentor, and his students included Carol Moseley Braun and Tony Podesta. In 1966 Barker won his university's highest teaching award, the UIC Silver Circle Award. He also won the 1969 E. Harris Harbison Prize from the Danforth Foundation for "unusual accomplishments in college teaching".

In addition to his academic work, Barker was also involved in local activism; for example, he worked against inequitable gentrification of his Chicago neighborhood, Groveland Park. He had two children. He died on July 13, 2009, having remained Professor Emeritus of Political Science at University of Illinois at Chicago.

Selected works
Civil Liberties and the Constitution, with Lucius Barker (1970)

Selected awards
UIC Silver Circle Award (1966)
E. Harris Harbison Prize, Danforth Foundation (1969)

References

1926 births
2009 deaths
African-American political scientists
American political scientists
People from Franklinton, Louisiana
Southern University alumni
University of Illinois Urbana-Champaign alumni
Southern Illinois University faculty
University of Illinois Chicago faculty
20th-century African-American people
21st-century African-American people
20th-century political scientists